Souleymane Cissé may refer to:

 Souleymane Cissé (film director) (born 1940), Malian film director
 Souleymane Cissé (footballer, born 1990), Senegalese international football midfielder for Louhans-Cuiseaux	
 Souleymane Cissé (footballer, born 1991), Senegalese football midfielder for Hajer
 Souleymane Cissé (footballer, born 1999), Senegalese football defender for Górnik Łęczna
 Souleymane Cissé (footballer, born 2002), French football centre-back for Clermont